The Rescue may refer to:

Art 
 The Rescue (painting), an 1855 painting by John Everett Millais
 The Rescue (statue), a marble sculpture group (1837–50) by Horatio Greenough

Film and television 
 "Chapter 16: The Rescue", 2020 episode of The Mandalorian
 The Rescue (1917 film), a silent drama starring Lon Chaney, Sr.
 The Rescue (1929 film), a romantic adventure by Herbert Brenon, based on Joseph Conrad's novel (see below)
 The Rescue (1971 film), a Shaw Brothers film
 The Rescue (1988 film), a film directed by Ferdinand Fairfax
 The Rescue (2020 film), a Chinese action film directed by Dante Lam
 The Rescue (2021 film), an American-British documentary film
 "The Rescue", seventh episode of the 1964 Doctor Who serial The Daleks
 The Rescue (Doctor Who), a serial from the second season of Doctor Who
 "The Rescue" (Dynasty 1984), a 1984 episode of Dynasty
 "The Rescue" (Dynasty 1986), a 1986 episode of Dynasty
 "The Rescue" (The O.C.), an episode of The O.C.

Literature 
 The Rescue (Conrad novel), a 1920 novel by Joseph Conrad
 The Rescue (Sparks novel), a 2000 novel by Nicholas Sparks
 The Rescue, a 2006 novel by Gordon Korman
 The Rescue, a manga novel based on the Warriors novel series by Erin Hunter

Music 
 The Rescue (Adam Cappa album)
 The Rescue (Explosions in the Sky album)
 The Rescue (Horsell Common album)
 "The Rescue", a song by American Hi-Fi from the soundtrack album Sound of Superman
 "The Rescue", a song by Kutless from To Know That You're Alive

See also 
 The Rescues, an American rock band
 The Rescuers (disambiguation)
 Rescue (disambiguation)